Angel novels have been published since 2000 by Pocket Books. The last was published in 2004.

Chronology

Season 1

These Buffyverse tales take place during Buffy season 4, and Angel season 1 (from autumn 1999 to spring 2000).

Season 2

These Buffyverse tales take place during Buffy season 5, and Angel season 2 (from autumn 2000 to spring 2001).

Season 3

These Buffyverse tales take place around Buffy season 6, and Angel Season 3 (from autumn 2001 to spring 2002).

Season 4

These Buffyverse tales take place around Buffy season 7, and Angel season 4 (from autumn 2002 to spring 2003).

Authors

Authors who have written Angel novels:

Scott Ciencin
Denise Ciencin
Don DeBrandt
Cameron Dokey
Doranna Durgin
Craig Shaw Gardner
Christopher Golden
Christie Golden
Nancy Holder
Dan Jolley
Ashley McConnell
Jeff Mariotte
Yvonne Navarro
Mel Odom
John Passarella
Thomas E. Sniegoski

Canonical issues

The books featured in this list are not part of Buffyverse canon. They are not considered as official Buffyverse reality, but are novels from the authors' imaginations. Unlike internet fan fiction however, all of these stories have been licensed as official Angel merchandise. Furthermore, the overall concept for each Buffyverse story had to be accepted by Joss Whedon (or his office), who did not want these stories to venture too far from his original intentions.

See also

 List of Buffy/Angel novels
 List of Buffyverse novels
 List of Buffy the Vampire Slayer novels
 List of television series made into books

Novel series